Kunitz is the surname of several people:

 Chris Kunitz (born 1979), a Canadian professional ice hockey player
 Jaana Kunitz (Yaana Kunitz; born 1972), an award-winning ballroom dancer and fitness program creator
 Matt Kunitz (born 1968), a television executive producer
 Moses Kunitz (1887–1978), a Russian-American biochemist
 Stanley Kunitz (1905–2006), an American poet

See also 
 Kunitz domain, a protein domain
 Kunitz STI protease inhibitor